The Religious Zionist Party, known as Tkuma until 2021 and still officially known as National Union–Tkuma, is a far-right, ultra-nationalist, Jewish supremacist, and religious Zionist political party in Israel.

Background
Tkuma was established by Hanan Porat and Zvi Hendel in 1998. The pair left the National Religious Party in reaction to the Wye Memorandum. Almost immediately after the creation of Tkuma, it joined together with Moledet and Herut – The National Movement, to form the National Union, a right-wing coalition which won four seats in the 1999 elections, with only one of those seats going to Tkuma. These elections were a failure for the right-wing bloc, and were won by Ehud Barak, leaving the National Union and Tkuma in the opposition.
In February 2000, Yisrael Beiteinu joined the National Union, alongside Tkuma, and the two parties joined Ariel Sharon's first government in 2001. One year later, Tkuma and the rest of the National Union left Sharon's government over disagreements over the handling of the Second Intifada. For the 2003 elections, the National Union kept its alliance with Yisrael Beiteinu, with its increased support helping to win seven seats for the entire list, and two for Tkuma. The party was included in Ariel Sharon's coalition, alongside Likud, Shinui, the National Religious Party, and Yisrael BaAliyah.

Because of tensions over the withdrawal from the Gaza Strip (Tkuma was ideologically opposed, and Hendel lived in the Gaza settlement of Ganei Tal), National Union ministers Binyamin Elon and Avigdor Lieberman were sacked, and the party left the coalition. However, the National Union was bolstered by the addition of Ahi, which had split off from the National Religious Party when they decided to remain in the coalition.

Before the 2006 elections, the alliance between the National Union and Yisrael Beiteinu was dissolved, and a new alliance between the National Union and the National Religious Party was formed, which won nine seats, two of which were allocated to Tkuma and taken by Hendel and Uri Ariel.

On 3 November 2008, ahead of the 2009 elections, Tkuma faced a crisis. The party itself announced that it would unite with Ahi, the National Religious Party, and Moledet, to form a new right-wing party, which was later named the Jewish Home. However, around half of the former Tkuma members later left the new party to re-establish Tkuma and rejoin the National Union alongside Moledet, Hatikva, and Eretz Yisrael Shelanu. In the elections themselves, the National Union got four seats, with Tkuma getting two seats.

Ahead of the 2013 elections, the National Union split, with all member parties except for Tkuma splitting off to form Otzma LeYisrael, leaving Tkuma as the only party left in the National Union. Tkuma proceeded to change its name to "National Union–Tkuma", appropriating the National Union name. The party opted to run as part of the Jewish Home list for the 2013 elections. The Jewish Home won 12 seats, four of which (Ariel, Ben-Dahan, Kalfa, and Strook) were members of Tkuma. The party decided to continue its alliance with the Jewish Home for the 2015 Knesset elections, taking the 2nd, 8th, 13th, and 17th spots on the joint list. The Jewish Home dropped to eight seats in that election.

In 2019, Bezalel Smotrich took over party leadership, winning party elections in a landslide against Ariel. Ahead of the April 2019 elections, the party joined with the Jewish Home and Otzma Yehudit to create the Union of Right-Wing Parties, which won five seats in the elections, two of which went to National Union–Tkuma.

Ahead of the September 2019 elections, Tkuma and the Jewish Home agreed to form an alliance with the New Right, called Yamina, with Tkuma leader Smotrich receiving the third spot on the joint list.

Yamina officially split on 10 October 2019 into two Knesset factions – the New Right, and the Jewish Home–National Union. For the 2020 elections, Otzma Yehudit and The Jewish Home agreed on 20 December to run together, in an alliance later named the United Jewish Home. Smotrich was critical of the move, stating that it was unlikely that the alliance would pass the electoral threshold. Tkuma, The Jewish Home, and the New Right reformed Yamina on 15 January 2020. On 22 April 2020, it was reported that Yamina leader Naftali Bennett was now "considering all options" for Yamina's political future, including departing from Netanyahu's government, which had just agreed to a coalition government with the leader of the opposition Blue and White party, Benny Gantz, and joining the opposition. Bennett was said to be unhappy with the new coalition government's decision to hold back on the issue of judicial reform.

On 14 May 2020 The Jewish Home's only Knesset member, Rafi Peretz, ended his status as a member of Yamina, and agreed to join Netanyahu's new government as well. On 15 May, Tkuma, along with the New Right, split with Netanyahu and made the Yamina alliance a member of the opposition. On 17 May 2020, Bennett met with Gantz, who also succeeded him as defence minister, and declared that the Yamina party would be a member of the opposition, with its "head held high". Tkuma was renamed on 7 January, while it ended its membership in Yamina on 20 January 2021.

In February 2021 the party agreed to run a shared list for the 2021 Knesset elections with Noam and Otzma Yehudit. The list ran under the Religious Zionist Party name and won six seats, four of which were filled by Religious Zionist Party members. On 14 June, after the swearing-in of the 36th government, MK Ofir Sofer split from the Likud faction and merged into the Religious Zionist Party, increasing the number of seats held by the party to seven. He had run during the election as part of the Likud list for Knesset, as a member of Atid Ehad party, using it as a shelf party (a dormant, but still-registered, party brought back into use).

The Religious Zionist Party, Noam and Otzma Yehudit submitted a single list on 14 September 2022 ahead of the 2022 Israeli legislative election. The parties split into three parties in the Knesset on 20 November 2022.

Ideology
The Religious Zionist Party is opposed to any territorial concessions to Palestinian or Syrian claims for land. Some members support the annexation of the entire West Bank, though the official policy of the Jewish Home parliamentary faction, of which the party was aligned between 2013 and 2019, only supports annexation of Area C of the West Bank, which makes up 63% of land in the West Bank. The party is opposed to recognition of same-sex marriage on a religious basis. The party advocates for increased funding for Torah study and religious education. Jewish-American columnist David E. Rosenberg has stated that the Religious Zionist Party's "platform includes things like annexation of West Bank settlements, expulsion of asylum-seekers, and political control of the judicial system". He further described the Religious Zionist Party as a political party "driven by Jewish supremacy and anti-Arab racism".

Leaders

Election results

Knesset members

See also
Orthodox Judaism
Religious Zionism
Gush Emunim

Notes

References

External links

 

Orthodox Jewish political parties
Political parties in Israel
Political parties established in 1998
Conservative parties in Israel
1998 establishments in Israel
Religious Zionism
Religious Zionist political parties in Israel
Right-wing populism in Israel
Right-wing populist parties
Social conservative parties
Right-wing parties
Right-wing politics in Israel